Nardis may refer to:

Nardis (composition), a 1958 modal jazz composition by Miles Davis
Nardis (album), a 1985 album by Jimmy Raney and Doug Raney featuring the Davis composition
Nardis Records, a record company founded in 2003
Cascate Nardis, a waterfall in Trentino, Italy

See also
 Laura DeNardis (born 1966), American scholar of internet architecture and governance
 Lawrence J. DeNardis (1938–2018), American politician